The Luciini are a tribe of butterflies in the family Lycaenidae.

Genera

Though containing few genera at present, some of these have numerous species. As not all Theclinae have been assigned to tribes, the following list of genera is preliminary:

 Acrodipsas
 Hypochrysops
 Lucia
 Parachrysops
 Paralucia
 Philiris
 Pseudodipsas
 Titea

 
Theclinae
Butterfly tribes